Billa Pandi, also spelled as Billa Paandi, is a 2018 Indian Tamil language romantic action drama film written and directed by Raj Sethupathy. The film stars R. K. Suresh, Chandini Tamilarasan, and Indhuja Ravichandran in the lead roles while Thambi Ramaiah, G. Marimuthu and Sangili Murugan play supportive roles. The music for the film is composed by Ilayavan while cinematography is handled by M Jeevan. A possible Hindi remake of the film was announced prior to the film's release during October 2018 and the remake rights were sold to Arihant, son of film producer Ashok Kumar with the remake is expected to go on floors from January 2019. The film was released on 6 November 2018 on the eve of Diwali. This film was average in the box office.

Plot 
A die hard Ajith fan, Billa Pandi (R. K. Suresh), works as a construction contractor and dedicates the rest of his time to helping others in his neighborhood. He is in love with his aunt's daughter Valli (Chandini Tamilarasan), but life drastically changes for him when Jayalakshmi (Indhuja Ravichandran), whose family's house he'd recently constructed, falls in love with him.

Cast 
 R. K. Suresh as Billa Pandi
 Chandini Tamilarasan as Valli
 Indhuja Ravichandran as Jayalakshmi
 G. Marimuthu as Valli's father
 Sangili Murugan as Jayalakshmanan
 Thambi Ramaiah
 Vidharth (special appearance)

Filming 
This film marked RK Suresh's first lead role in a Tamil film. The filmmakers also revealed that the film is based on a person who plays the role of Thala Ajith's fan, and he forces two women to love him as no girl would consider him. The filmmakers also revealed that the film is dedicated to the fans of Ajith Kumar. The portions of the film were shot and set in Madurai.

References

External links 

 

2010s Tamil-language films
2018 action drama films
2018 romantic drama films
Films set in Madurai
Films shot in Madurai
Indian action drama films
Indian romantic action films
Indian romantic drama films
2018 masala films